GTT may refer to:

Science and technology
 Global title translation, in telecommunications
 Glucose tolerance test
 Google Translator Toolkit
 Graphics translation table
 Drop (unit), abbreviated gtt on prescriptions

Other uses
 Georgetown Airport (Queensland), in Australia
 Gone to Texas
 Gruppo Torinese Trasporti, a public transport company in Turin, Italy
 GTT Communications, Inc., an American telecommunications company